A myxoid tumor is a connective tissue tumor with a "myxoid" background, composed of clear, mucoid substance.

This tumoral phenotype is shared by many tumoral entities:
 Myxomas
 Atrial myxoma
 Odontogenic myxoma
 Cutaneous myxoma
 Intramuscular myxoma
 Myxoid hamartoma
 Aggressive angiomyxoma
 Myxoid leiomyoma
 Chondromyxoid fibroma
 Myxoid neurofibroma
 Nerve sheath myxoma (neurothekeoma)
 Myxolipoma
 Angiomyofibroblastoma
 Myxoid leiomyosarcoma
 Myxoid liposarcoma
 Lipoblastoma
 Myxofibrosarcoma
 Myxoid cortical adenoma
 Pleomorphic adenoma
 Undifferentiated embryonal sarcoma
 Plexiform angiomyxoid myofibroblastic tumor
 Myxoid plexiform fibrohistiocytic tumor
 Angiomyxolipoma (vascular myxolipoma)
 Parachordoma
 Acral myxoinflammatory fibroblastic sarcoma

References

Tumoral phenotype